Skjervøy or Skjervøya may refer to the following:

Skjervøy, a municipality in northern Troms county, Norway
Skjervøy (village), a village in Skjervøy municipality, Troms county, Norway
Skjervøya, an island in Skjervøy municipality, Troms county, Norway
Skjervøy Church, a church in Skjervøy municipality, Troms county, Norway
Skjervøy Bridge, a bridge in Skjervøy municipality, Troms county, Norway
Skjervøy IK, a sports club based in Skjervøy municipality, Troms county, Norway
Skjervøya (Trøndelag), an island group in Osen municipality, Trøndelag county, Norway